Matías Agüero (born 13 February 1981 in San Nicolás) is an Italian Argentine rugby union player who plays as a prop for Leicester Tigers.

Agüero was also part of the team that played in the 2007 Rugby World Cup, which he played one game against Portugal . For a year that was his last appearance for the national team before the call of the new Italy coach, Nick Mallett, during the test match autumn of 2008 and, thereafter, the tour summer 2009 in Australasia.

After the dissolution of Aironi, Agüero joined the new Italian franchise Zebre. On 12 November 2015, Aguero was signed by English club Leicester Tigers for the remainder of the 2015-16 Aviva Premiership season.

References

External links
Leicester Tigers Profile

Profile at ercrugby.com

1981 births
Living people
Rugby union props
People from San Nicolás de los Arroyos
Sportspeople from Buenos Aires Province
Argentine rugby union players
Italian rugby union players
Aironi players
Saracens F.C. players
Argentine emigrants to Italy
Argentine expatriate sportspeople in Italy
Italy international rugby union players
Zebre Parma players
Leicester Tigers players